Vetri Kodi Kattu is a 2000 Indian Tamil-language drama film written and directed by Cheran. The film stars starring Murali, Parthiban, Meena, and Malavika, while Vadivelu, Manorama, Anandaraj, Vijayakumar, and Charle play supporting roles. The film's score and music was composed by Deva. The film released on 30 June 2000, and the comedy track between Parthiban and Vadivelu in this film was well received."Karupputhan Enakku pidicha colouru"song was well appreciated.

Plot

Sekhar lives in a village near Tenkasi with his mother Deivanai and two sisters. A drought hits their village, his elder sister's husband sends her home to get back her due dowry amount, and Sekar's agriculture does not prove to be profitable, which prompts Sekhar to grab the opportunity to leave for Dubai. Despite being a graduate, he sells a portion of his land and gives Rs.1 Lakh to Anandaraj, who manages a firm dealing in arranging work visas to people and enabling them to migrate to Dubai for manual labour.

Muthuraman lives in a village near Coimbatore. Despite being a graduate, he works for the village landlord as accountant. He falls in love with the landlord's only daughter Valli, and the couple get married without the landlord's consent. Valli challenges her father that she will lead a good life with Muthu. To earn money, Muthu also enrolls with Anandaraj's firm to go to Dubai. Anandaraj takes all the people enrolled with him to Chennai, and the flight is scheduled to leave the next day. To everyone's shock, Anandaraj runs away with the corpus fund collected the same night. The police informs that Anandaraj is a fraud involved in looting money.

Everyone leaves the place with much disappointment except Sekhar and Muthu as they are scared much thinking of the consequences to their families if they get to know about the loss of money. They clearly guess that their respective families will have to commit suicide out of shame and loss. Sekhar and Muthu get to know about each other's family situation and come up with a plan. Sekar goes to Muthu's home and vice versa. Sekhar introduces himself as Muthu's orphan friend who has returned from Dubai. Similarly, Muthu introduces to Sekhar's family as Sekhar's friend from Dubai.

Muthu understands that though the soil in Sekhar's land is not fit for agriculture,  it can be used for grazing of cows, so he decides to buy a couple of cows with the help of Sudalaimuthu and starts a milk business. Meanwhile, Sekhar starts a small restaurant business, as Valli cooks very well. Muthu's sister Amudha falls in love with Sekhar, but he does not reciprocate, thinking that it would be betraying Muthu's trust. Both the family situations improve, and within 8 months, Valli-Sekhar duo rent a building in City for their restaurant. Valli feels proud that she has won the challenge against her father.

On the day of restaurant opening, Valli gets furious knowing about Amudha's love towards Sekhar and asks him to leave home. Sekhar stays in a place opposite Valli's home. That night, Valli, who was already pregnant, suffers the pains of labour. Sekhar admits her in a hospital, informs Muthu about the situation, and asks him to come immediately. Deivanai overhears Muthu's telephone conversation with Sekhar and understands that her son is not in Dubai, as believed by everyone. Muthu apologizes to Deivanai, and everyone leaves to his village to visit Valli, where she gives birth to a baby girl. Everyone learns of Muthu and Sekhar's plans, and they feel proud about their sacrifice for the well-being of their family members.

Pazhani, who is also cheated by Anandaraj, finds him in Coimbatore under another name and running another fake agency and informs Muthu and Sekhar. Now, Muthu and Sekhar rush to place and badly thrash Anandaraj and his men for looting the hard-earned money from the poor. Anandaraj is handed over to the police, and the Police Commissioner who had reprimanded them for losing their money to Anandaraj in Chennai and is now posted in Coimbatore assures everyone that the money lost will be recovered. Meanwhile, Muthu and Sekhar make the others realize that there are plenty of opportunities available in India to earn money, and instead there is no need to leave to another country to make money leaving all the relatives and family members back there, and the Police Commissioner praises them for their views. Muthu and Sekhar reconcile with their families at the Commissioner's office, and go to Muthu's village for lunch. There Muthu and Valli openly agree to get Amudha married to Sekhar.

Cast

Awards
National Film Awards
2000 : National Film Award for Best Film on Other Social Issues - Shivashakti Pandian
Tamil Nadu State Film Awards
2000 : Tamil Nadu State Film Award for Best Film - Third Prize - Shivashakti Pandian

Soundtrack

The soundtrack features five songs composed by Deva. "Karupputhan Enakku" was a huge hit at that time. Lyrics were written by Vairamuthu, Kalaikumar, Pa. Vijay, Ra. Ravishankar and Deva.

Production
This film was Cheran's third and last combo with Murali, Meena and second with Parthiban. Thangar Bachan was replaced by Priyan as cinematographer. The shooting for the film was held at places like Gobichettipalayam, Dindigul and Palani among other places.

Reviews
Malathi Ranagarajan from The Hindu wrote "The director, in his eagerness to drive home his message, makes certain scenes so pedantic that they tire one after a point." Indolink wrote: "Vetrikkodi Kattu is your average, predictable, clean, and reasonably engaging Tamil movie fare". Chennaionline wrote:"'Vettrikkodi Kattu' is a well-intentioned film and fairly entertaining too. It may not be as neatly scripted and as good as Cheran's first two films. But it proves that he is on the right track". Subash of oocities.org wrote, "Wonderful story, JUST DON'T PREACH SO MUCH, Cheran."

References

External links
Review by thenisai
Review by Tamilentertinment

2000 films
Films directed by Cheran
Films about poverty in India
2000s Tamil-language films
Films about immigration
Best Film on Other Social Issues National Film Award winners
Films shot in Palani